Coburg is an electoral constituency (German: Wahlkreis) represented in the Bundestag. It elects one member via first-past-the-post voting. Under the current constituency numbering system, it is designated as constituency 238. It is located in northern Bavaria, comprising the city of Coburg and the districts of Landkreis Coburg and Kronach.

Coburg was created for the inaugural 1949 federal election. Since 2021, it has been represented by Jonas Geissler of the Christian Social Union (CSU).

Geography
Coburg is located in northern Bavaria. As of the 2021 federal election, it comprises the independent city of Coburg, the districts of Landkreis Coburg and Kronach, and the municipality of Geroldsgrün from the Hof district.

History
Coburg was created in 1949. In the 1949 election, it was Bavaria constituency 26 in the numbering system. In the 1953 through 1961 elections, it was number 221. In the 1965 through 1998 elections, it was number 224. In the 2002 and 2005 elections, it was number 239. Since the 2009 election, it has been number 238.

Originally, the constituency comprised the independent cities of Coburg and Neustadt bei Coburg and the districts of Landkreis Coburg and Kronach. In the 1976 through 2013 elections, it comprised the city of Coburg and the districts of Landkreis Coburg and Kronach. In the 2017 election, it acquired the municipality of Geroldsgrün from the Hof district.

Members
The constituency was first represented by Ernst Zühlke of the Social Democratic Party (SPD) from 1949 to 1953. Wolfgang Stammberger won it in 1953; he was elected for the Free Democratic Party (FDP) with the endorsement of the Christian Social Union (CSU). Friedrich Knorr of the CSU was elected in 1957 and served until 1965. Karl Hofmann of the SPD won the constituency in 1965 and served three terms, leaving office in 1976. Otto Regenspurger of the CSU then served until 1998, when Uwe Hiksch was elected representative for a single term. Hiksch was elected for the SPD, but defected to the Party of Democratic Socialism (PDS) in October 1999. Hans Michelbach of the CSU was elected in 2002 and served until 2021. He was succeeded by Jonas Geissler in 2021.

Election results

2021 election

2017 election

2013 election

2009 election

Notes

References

Federal electoral districts in Bavaria
1949 establishments in West Germany
Constituencies established in 1949
Coburg
Coburg (district)
Kronach (district)
Hof (district)